'Chinwe' is a name given by the Igbo people of South-Eastern Nigeria to both sexes but more commonly to girls. It means "God owns" ( = God,  = owns) and is a shortened form the ending of which can present in a number of ways depending on the intentions behind the naming

For example:
  = God is the owner of the universe or everything on mother earth belongs to God
  = God owns life
  = God owns thanks (thanks belong to God)
  = God owns wealth
  = God owns peace
  = God owns dignity

It is affectionately shortened to 'Chichi' or just 'Chi' but this property is not unique to it, all Igbo names beginning with Chi can be so shortened.

Notable Chinwes:
 Chinwe Chukwuogo-Roy (1952−2012), Nigerian-British visual artist
 Chinwe Obaji, Nigerian academic and former Federal Minister of Education
 Chinwe Okoro (born 1989), Nigerian-American throws athlete
 Chinwe Egbunike-Umegbolu (born 1983), Nigerian-British lawyer

References

Nigerian names